D:Ream is a Northern Irish/English pop & dance group. They had a UK No. 1 hit with "Things Can Only Get Better" in 1994. Eight more top 40 hits followed, including "U R the Best Thing" and "Shoot Me with Your Love". They released three albums, two of which reached the UK top five. 

The group had a line-up which varied in number, but centred on lead singer Peter Cunnah. The live band included keyboard player Brian Cox, who later became a science broadcaster on television; although Cunnah, played keyboards on studio recordings.

Early career
In 1992, D:Ream released the single "U R the Best Thing", an piano-house tune which did not chart. However, thanks to a Sasha remix, it was Pete Tong's Essential Tune of 1992. "Things Can Only Get Better", released in the spring of 1993, gave the group their first chart success. "U R The Best Thing" was eventually re-released in April 1993 and was the group's second chart hit. In 1994, they were nominated for Best Dance act in the MTV Europe music awards, and then for Best Single in the 1995 BRIT Awards.

The band's first album, D:Ream on Volume 1, which was promoted for almost two years, produced seven singles ("Star" and "I Like It" came on a joint release as a double A-side). It was the track "Things Can Only Get Better" that gave them UK success and international fame. After they supported Take That on their tour, "Things Can Only Get Better" topped the UK Singles Chart, in early 1994. Originally released in early 1993, when the track reached No. 24 in the UK, it was later adopted by the Labour Party as their theme for the 1997 UK General Election, and consequently released for the third time; this time reaching No. 19 on the UK chart.

Between 1992 and 1997, the band released two studio albums, (D:Ream on Volume 1 and World), ten different singles, two of which were released three times, and an official greatest hits album, (The Best of D:Ream). In 1997, the group's record label released their first compilation, The Best of D:Ream, rather than their third studio album, which remains unreleased. In 2006, a second collection was released, for The Platinum Collection series.

When D:Ream broke through into the charts, the band's main touring line-up consisted of core members Peter Cunnah (vocalist, songwriter)  and Al Mackenzie (musician). Other main performers included physicist Brian Cox, who played keyboards for several years while working towards his physics PhD before being replaced by Simon Ellis, as well as Derek Chai on bass, and drummer Mark Roberts. The group also used a number of guest vocalists, such as T.J. Davis, who is featured as co-lead vocalist on "The Power (Of All the Love in the World)", one of the singles taken from their second album. He also provided backing vocals on many other songs.

Reunion, and split-up
In 2008 D:Ream reformed after a chance meeting by Cunnah and Mackenzie. They recorded a new album released in 2011 on their own label User Records and their single, "All Things to All Men" was released on 7 September 2009. They also planned concert dates to follow. Meanwhile, Brian Cox became a physics professor and science broadcaster and is currently working on the Large Hadron Collider project. In late 2010 he announced that he was to provide some keyboard work for the new album, but would not be re-joining the band full-time. As part of their 2012 commitments, the band played main support to Wheatus at the LeeStock Music Festival in Sudbury, Suffolk.

On July 23, 2021 Cunnah and Mackenzie released a new studio album “Open Hearts Open Minds” marking their first album since 2011’s “In Memory Of…”.

Discography

Studio albums

Compilations

Extended plays

Singles

See also
List of number-one dance hits (United States)
List of artists who reached number one on the US Dance chart

References

External links
 D:Ream's official website
 Discogs Detailed bio-discography with links to all releases

Pop music groups from Northern Ireland
Electronic music groups from Northern Ireland
Musical groups from Derry (city)
Musical groups established in 1992
1992 establishments in Northern Ireland
Magnet Records artists
Sire Records artists